The 2014 European Rally Championship season was the 62nd season of the FIA European Rally Championship, the European continental championship series in rallying. The season was also the second following the merger between the European Rally Championship and the Intercontinental Rally Challenge.

The season started in Austria on January 3, with the Internationale Jänner Rallye and finished in November 8 in Tour de Corse. Esapekka Lappi (Škoda Fabia S2000) was the 2014 European Champion.

In addition to the championship title, the series introduced three additional trophies, with one for each surface type. The "Ice Master" trophy was awarded to the driver who scores the most points on snow events, while the "Gravel Master" trophy was presented to the driver who scores the most points on gravel rallies, and the driver who scores the most points on tarmac events won the "Asphalt Master" trophy.

For the Ice Master were accounted the result of winter rallies in Austria and Latvia. The Gravel Masters was composed by Acropolis (2nd sector only), Azores, Estonia and Cyprus while the Asphalt Master was contested in Acropolis (1st sector only), Ireland, Ypres, the Czech Republic, Valais and Corsica.

Calendar

The calendar for the 2014 season initially featured twelve rallies.

Notes:
 – Sibiu Rally Romania was supposed to be run in late February, but was postponed due to the weather conditions for October, and later was cancelled.

Calendar Changes

 The 2014 European Rally Championship saw the addition of the Acropolis Rally, recently dropped from the 2014 World Rally Championship season in favour of the Rally Poland.
 The Sibiu Rally Romania was originally to be run in February, to become the third and final event in the newly created Winter Challenge mini-series. However, bad weather conditions in the country and the roads being inaccessible caused the rally to be postponed in October as a fully gravel event. Later, the rally was cancelled.
 The Tour de Corse changed its date, and became the season finale.
 The Rally Islas Canarias El Corte Inglés, the Croatia Rally and the Rallye Sanremo were dropped from the championship.

Selected entries

Results

Championship standings

Drivers' Championship
 For the drivers' championship, only the best four results from the first six rallies and the best four results from the remaining six rallies could be retained by each driver.
 Points for final position are awarded as in following table

 Bonus points awarded for position in each Leg

Other classifications
 For the Masters, points are awarded for each special stage using a system of 10–6–4–2–1 with all stages counting.

Ice Masters

Note: 14 more competitors have scored points for the Ice Masters

Gravel Masters

Note: 30 more competitors have scored points for the Gravel Masters

Asphalt Masters

Note: 30 more competitors have scored points for the Asphalt Masters

Production Cup

Note: 63 more competitors have scored points for the Production Cup

ERC Juniors
The ERC Junior Championship is awarded to drivers who had scored the highest number of points from the best results made on 4 eligible rallies, including one gravel.
Strike-out text means classification not accounted.

References

External links
 

 
European Rally Championship
Rally Championship
European Rally Championship seasons